Ernst Baumann (17 April 1909, in Wileroltigen – 9 January 1992, in Basel) was a Swiss painter and artist.

Selected works 
 1945, 1950 Murals at Friedhof am Hörnli and Wolfgottesacker, Basel
 1956 Mural "Der Frühling" (Spring), Kantonsspital Basel
 1962 Mosaic "Kind und Natur" (Child and Nature), Erlensträsschen school, Riehen (BS)
 1965 Mural, government building, Bottmingen (BL)

Exhibitions 
 1952 and 1956 Museum Allerheiligen, Schaffhausen
 1960 Kunstverein, Olten
 1955 to 1960 several exhibitions at the Bettie Thommen Gallery, Basel
 1964 Kunsthalle, Basel
 1974, 1979 Bodenacker school, Liestal
 1976 Trubschachen Art Exhibition 
 1982 Bad Homburg vor der Höhe
 1988 Schweizerische Schifffahrtsschule, Basel
 1989 Ausstellungsraum Kaserne, Basel
 1993 Memorial exhibition at Bodenacker school, Liestal
 1999 Memorial exhibition "Sprützehüsli", Oberwil
 2001 Trubschachen Art Exhibition
 2002 Schär und Wildbolz Gallery, Solothurn

References

20th-century Swiss painters
20th-century Swiss male artists
Swiss male painters
1909 births
1992 deaths